The 1996 Asian Rhythmic Gymnastics Championships was held in Changsha, China, September 1996.

Medal winners

References 

Rhythmic Gymnastics Asian Championships
International gymnastics competitions hosted by China
1996 in gymnastics
1996 in Chinese sport